David Hilton (born 10 November 1977) is an English former footballer who played in the Football League for Darlington. He played as a left back or on the left wing.

Career
Hilton was born in Barnsley, Yorkshire. He was a schoolboy international; in June 1993, the Independent's Henry Winter reported that "the chase [was] on to sign David Hilton, a left-sided Barnsley boy with a healthy appetite for raiding down the wing". The chase was won by Manchester United, for whom Hilton had signed schoolboy forms by the time he appeared for England under-16s the following February.

Hilton was a substitute in the second leg of the 1995 FA Youth Cup Final, won by Manchester United on penalties. He turned professional with the club, but never appeared for the first team. Towards the end of the 1996–97 season, with his contract due to expire, Hilton had a trial at Burnley, where he impressed manager Adrian Heath, but no contract ensued. He joined Darlington on a monthly contract at the start of the 1997–98 Football League season and appeared once, on 30 August as a late substitute in a 1–1 draw with Rotherham United in Division Three. In early 1998, Hilton joined Scottish First Division club Ayr United on trial, on the recommendation of Manchester United manager Alex Ferguson. He signed for them in March, but never played for the first team.

References

1977 births
Living people
Footballers from Barnsley
English footballers
England youth international footballers
Association football defenders
Manchester United F.C. players
Darlington F.C. players
Ayr United F.C. players
English Football League players